Gyong, also known as Kagoma, is a Plateau language of Nigeria. It is spoken by the Gwong people, whose indigenous homeland is in Jema'a Local Government Area in the southern part of Kaduna State, Nigeria.

References

Central Plateau languages
Languages of Nigeria